"Paying It Forward" is a science fiction short story   by American writer Michael A. Burstein, published in 2003.  It was nominated for the 2004 Hugo Award for Best Short Story. It may be confused with the novel Pay it Forward by Catherine Ryan Hyde. And the term Paying it Forward is used in her book

Plot summary
The story is told from an unnamed narrator's point of view, who describes his relationship with a famous science fiction author via a series of email correspondences.  The strange thing is that the correspondences don't begin until after the author's death.  Throughout many years the narrator receives great wisdom from the deceased author, only learning the truth when he himself is about to die.

References

External links 
 

American short stories
Science fiction short stories
Works originally published in Analog Science Fiction and Fact
2003 short stories